Ouvrage Col du Fort is a lesser work (petit ouvrage) of the Maginot Line's Alpine extension, the Alpine Line. An additional block was planned but not built.

Description
Block 1 (entry, not completed): two machine gun embrasures, never armed.
Block 2 (entry): one machine gun embrasure and one heavy twin machine gun embrasure.
Block 3 (observation): one observation cloche.
Block 4 (unbuilt): one heavy twin machine gun embrasure. Only an opening to the gallery exists, work was interrupted by the outbreak of war in 1940.

The Granges-de-la-Brasque barracks is located nearby.

See also
 List of Alpine Line ouvrages

References

Bibliography 
Allcorn, William. The Maginot Line 1928-45. Oxford: Osprey Publishing, 2003. 
Kaufmann, J.E. and Kaufmann, H.W. Fortress France: The Maginot Line and French Defenses in World War II, Stackpole Books, 2006. 
Kaufmann, J.E., Kaufmann, H.W., Jancovič-Potočnik, A. and Lang, P. The Maginot Line: History and Guide, Pen and Sword, 2011. 
Mary, Jean-Yves; Hohnadel, Alain; Sicard, Jacques. Hommes et Ouvrages de la Ligne Maginot, Tome 1. Paris, Histoire & Collections, 2001.  
Mary, Jean-Yves; Hohnadel, Alain; Sicard, Jacques. Hommes et Ouvrages de la Ligne Maginot, Tome 4 - La fortification alpine. Paris, Histoire & Collections, 2009.  
Mary, Jean-Yves; Hohnadel, Alain; Sicard, Jacques. Hommes et Ouvrages de la Ligne Maginot, Tome 5. Paris, Histoire & Collections, 2009.

External links 
 Col du Fort (petit ouvrage du) at fortiff.be 

COLF
Maginot Line
Alpine Line